A popular referendum, depending on jurisdiction also known as a citizens' veto, people's veto, veto referendum, citizen referendum, abrogative referendum, rejective referendum, suspensive referendum, and statute referendum, is a type of a referendum that provides a means by which a petition signed by a certain minimum number of registered voters can force a public vote (plebiscite) on an existing statute, constitutional amendment, charter amendment, or ordinance; in its minimal form, it simply obliges the executive or legislative bodies to consider the subject by submitting it to the order of the day. It is a form of direct democracy.

Unlike an initiative or legislative referendum that allows voters to suggest new legislation, a popular referendum allows them to suggest repealing existing legislation. As with an initiative, a popular referendum is held after a given number of signatures supporting it have been submitted to the authorities; in some cases, such a referendum may also be initiated by regional authorities. Depending on local legislation, the popular referendum may be implemented only in a short window of time after the legislation has been passed; in others it may be used to defeat any existing legislation. Specific details on the applicable procedure such as the number of signatures, whether there is a time limit and its duration on when the popular referendum may be passed, and the body to which they must be submitted vary from country to country, and in the United States from state to state.

Supporters of the popular referendum point out that it is a safeguard against special interests taking over, and protects the rights of minorities. Critics point out that direct democracy votes are dominated by people who have strong feelings about the issue at hand, and as such, it empowers special interests.

Worldwide implementation

Europe 
Thirty countries allow for referendum initiated by the population on the national level
In Europe the popular referendum (commonly known as abrogative referendum) was first introduced in Switzerland in St. Gallen canton in 1831, and was introduced to the whole country known as the optional referendum. It now exists in Albania, Denmark (since 1953), Italy (since 1970), Malta, Russia and Switzerland (since 1874). CoE, Venice Commission, Referendums in Europe – an analysis of the legal rules in the European states

Latin America 
In Latin America, the popular referendum exists in Colombia, Uruguay and Venezuela.

United States 

In the United States, such a process exists, as of May 2009, in 23 states and one territory: Alaska, Arizona, Arkansas, California, Colorado, Idaho, Maine, Maryland, Massachusetts, Michigan, Missouri, Montana, Nebraska, Nevada, New Mexico, North Dakota, Ohio, Oklahoma, Oregon, South Dakota, Utah, Washington, Wisconsin, Wyoming and the U.S. Virgin Islands. The popular referendum was first introduced in the United States by South Dakota in 1898, and first used in the United States in 1906, in Oregon, two years after the initiative was used (in 1904, also in Oregon).

See also
 Initiative
 Recall election
 Legislative referral

References

Direct democracy
Referendums